This is a list of Ancestral Puebloan dwellings in Colorado, United States.

Pueblo periods 

Archaeologists have agreed on three main periods of occupation by Pueblo peoples in southwestern Colorado: Pueblo I, Pueblo II, and Pueblo III.

 Pueblo I (750 to 900). Pueblo buildings were built with stone, generally oriented to the south, and in U, E and L shapes.  The buildings were located more closely together than the previous Basketmaker period and reflected deepening religious celebration.  Towers were built, often near kivas, though their purpose (defense?, storage?, ceremonies?) still is debated. Pottery became more versatile, not just for cooking, but now included pitchers, ladles, bowls, jars and dishware for food and drink. White pottery with black designs emerged, the pigments coming from plants.  Water management and conservation techniques, including the use of reservoirs and silt-retaining dams, also emerged during this period. Midway through this period, about 900, the number of residential sites in the Hovenweep area increased.
 Pueblo II (900-1150). During the Pueblo II period there was an increase in population that resulted in creation of more than 10,000 sites in 250 years.  Because much of the land is arid, and crop yields were highly variable, people supplemented their diets by hunting, foraging and trading for food. By the end of the period, there were multiple-story dwellings made primarily of stone masonry, towers (especially in southwestern Colorado and southeastern Utah), and family and community kivas.
 Pueblo III (1150-1300). Rohn and Ferguson, authors of Puebloan Ruins of the Southwest, state that during the Pueblo III period there was a significant community change.  Population tended to coalesce into larger community centers at canyon heads or under cliff overhangs. Population peaked between 1200 and 1250 to more than 20,000 in the Mesa Verde region. However, by 1300 most Pueblo people had abandoned the Four Corners area, as the result of climate changes and food shortages. They are believed to have moved south and east to villages in Arizona and New Mexico, especially the Rio Grande valley near what is today Santa Fe and Albuquerque.

Types of Buildings 
In addition to the movable structures used by other Native Americans across North and South America, the Pueblo peoples created distinctive structures for living, worshiping, defense, storage, and daily life.

 Pueblo - Referring to both a certain style of Puebloan architecture and groups of people themselves, the term pueblo is used in architectural terms to describe single-story or multistory buildings made of coursed stone or adobe, and occasionally jacal. Usually these buildings were plastered with adobe both inside and outside.
 Kiva - Circular underground buildings used for ceremonies, preparations for ceremonies and as retreats for families during the worst months of winter. Kivas may have evolved from pit houses. Found throughout the Ancestral Pueblo area and in parts of the Mogollon region (central Arizona), they generally feature a bench around the inside walls, pilasters against the walls to hold up the beams of the roof, a fire pit, a ventilator shaft to bring air to the fire pit and a square opening in the roof with a ladder to enter the kiva. A kiva generally was located in front of a family's suite of pueblo rooms.
 Great houses - Large adobe-plastered stone buildings believed to be mostly ceremonial in use, though they may have been used in part as residences. In the Chacoan period (roughly equivalent to PII, 900 to 1150 A.D.) these buildings share certain features, such as large rooms (15 feet square), massive size, elevated position and core-and-veneer masonry. They also often have blocked-in kivas, tower kivas and nearby great kivas. In the Pueblo III (PIII) period (1150-1300 A.D.) ceremonial buildings were less distinct from residential structures in room size and often included enclosed plazas.
 Great kivas - Large versions of traditional "family" kivas that appear to have been intended for use by the larger community, especially in Chacoan times. There are great kivas as large as 75 feet across, such as Casa Rinconada in Chaco Canyon. Roofs are held up by massive posts set into special recesses in the floors.  In earlier times, such as PI, great kivas might not be roofed. In the Mogollon region, square great kivas often were built.
 Pit houses - In the Basketmaker and early PI periods most of the populations of the Southwest lived in pit houses, carefully dug rectangular or circular depressions in the earth with branch and mud adobe walls supported by log sized corner posts. While pit houses never completely disappeared, after PI most residences were above-ground blocks of pueblo rooms, usually with at least one "family" kiva in front.
 Cliff dwellings - Pueblos constructed under overhangs in the cliff sides of the mesas in the Southwest. Cliff dwellings were a relatively late development in Pueblo communities (mostly after 1150) and are considered to have been built at least partly for defensive reasons.
 Trincheras - The Hohokam and Trincheras culture used these distinctive type sites in the Southwest and northwest Mexico. Trincheras sites are usually located on steep slopes of hills and low mountains, and are characterized by terraces and walls that stairstep up the slope. Remains of the terraces and walls reminded early explorers of "trincheras," the Spanish term for entrenchments or fortifications.
 Jacal is a type of wall in Pueblo buildings made of woven reeds and sticks covered with adobe. Slim close-set poles were tied together and filled out with mud, clay and grasses.

Locations

Archuleta County

Dolores County 
For Canyons of the Ancients sites, also see the Canyons of the Ancients section.

La Plata County

Montezuma County

Anasazi Heritage Center

Canyons of the Ancients

Hawkins Preserve

Hovenweep National Monument 

The Hovenweep National Monument (Site ID 5MT.604) is registered on the National and Colorado State Historic Registers.

McElmo Drainage Unit 

The McElmo Drainage Unit, located in Montezuma and Dolores Counties, consists of tributaries of McElmo Creek, situated north of the northern slopes of Mesa Verde and Ute Mountain, that is part of the northern San Juan River drainage. For Sand Canyon, see the Canyons of the Ancients and for Ansel Hall, see Dolores County.

Mesa Verde 
Mesa Verde National Park (Site ID 5MT.9790) is listed in the National and State Registers of Historic places.

Towaoc area

Other 
The sites are sorted by nearest town and site name.

Montrose County

Gallery

See also 

 History of Colorado
 Manitou Cliff Dwellings, tourist attraction, not authentic ruins.
 List of prehistoric sites in Colorado
 Outline of Colorado prehistory
 Trail of the Ancients

References 

 Colorado
Colorado
Pueblo
Former populated places in Colorado
Religious places of the indigenous peoples of North America